Ismael Vázquez Virreira (26 September 1865 – 4 September 1930) was a Bolivian lawyer, orator and politician who served as the 20th vice president of Bolivia from 1917 to 1920. He served as first vice president alongside second vice president José Santos Quinteros during the administration of José Gutiérrez Guerra.

Biography 
José Carrasco Torrico was born on 26 September 1865 in Cochabamba. In 1896, he began his political career of deputy for Cochabamba, a position he would hold multiple times along with the office of senator. In 1911, he was appointed plenipotentiary minister in Venezuela. He was Minister of Justice and Industry in 1915 and was elected first Vice President of the Republic of José Gutiérrez in 1917. In 1919, he was also made Minister of Government. On 12 July 1920, he was overthrown along with the rest of the Gutiérrez government. 

He died in Cochabamba on 4 September 1930.

References 

1865 births
1930 deaths
Liberal Party (Bolivia) politicians
Vice presidents of Bolivia